Matthew Raymond Snoddy OBE, born , commonly known as Raymond Snoddy, is a British news media journalist, television presenter, author and media commentator.  From its inception in 2004, until January 2013, he was the original and sole presenter of the BBC News 24's weekly viewer right-to-reply programme NewsWatch. Snoddy started his journalistic career writing for a number of publications on issues relating to the news industry, and continues in this vein.

Life and career
Born in Larne, County Antrim, Northern Ireland, Snoddy was educated at Larne Grammar School, and Queen's University in Belfast. After university, he worked on local and regional newspapers, before joining The Times in 1971. He later moved to the Financial Times (FT), joining in 1978, and reporting on media issues for the paper, before returning to The Times as media editor in 1997. Whilst working at the FT, Snoddy made occasional appearances as guest presenter on the observational newspaper review TV show What the Papers Say. At present, Snoddy is a freelance journalist, writing predominantly for The Independent, although his articles sometimes appear in other newspapers and publications.

Following his departure from The Times in late June 2004, Snoddy presented NewsWatch from its inception in 2004 to 2013.  The programme, now titled as Newswatch, was launched as a response to the Hutton Inquiry, as part of an initiative to make BBC News more accountable. His other television work has included presenting Channel 4's award-winning series Hard News, which covered the press, and Sky News' Media Monthly.

In addition, Snoddy is the author of a biography of the media tycoon Michael Green: The Good, the Bad and the Unacceptable: The Hard News about the British Press, about ethics in the newspaper industry, and other books.

Whilst Media Editor at The Times in 2000, Snoddy was awarded the honour of the Ordinary Officer of the Civil Division of the said Most Excellent Order of the British Empire (OBE); for his services to journalism.

Bibliography
1993: The Good, the Bad and the Unacceptable: the hard news about the British press, Faber & Faber, 
1996: Greenfinger: the rise of Michael Green and Carlton Communications, Faber & Faber, 
2001: It Could Be You: the untold story of the National Lottery, Faber & Faber,

References

1946 births
People from Larne
People educated at Larne Grammar School
Alumni of Queen's University Belfast
British male journalists
Journalists from Northern Ireland
BBC newsreaders and journalists
Television presenters from Northern Ireland
Officers of the Order of the British Empire
Living people
Columnists from Northern Ireland
Male non-fiction writers from Northern Ireland